Humour Resources is a Canadian television comedy series, which premiered on CBC Television in January 2021. The series stars Jon Dore as a fictionalized version of himself, in the role of a retired comedian turned human resources manager who is conducting performance evaluation interviews with other real comedians about their strengths, weaknesses and performance benchmarks as "employees" of comedy. The series is also interspersed with scenes from his personal life, including his family life with his wife Christina Love, and his recurring interactions with a fast-food clerk at the local drive-thru (Dan Beirne) whom he considers his only real friend.

The series was created by Dore, Adam Brodie and Dave Derewlany for Just for Laughs, and was shot remotely in fall 2020 with all interviews conducted through videoconferencing due to the COVID-19 pandemic in Canada.

The series received two Canadian Screen Award nominations at the 10th Canadian Screen Awards in 2022, for Best Sketch Comedy Series and Best Performance in a Variety or Sketch Comedy Program or Series (Dore).

Episodes

References

External links

2020s Canadian workplace comedy television series
2021 Canadian television series debuts
CBC Television original programming
Just for Laughs